Amos Arthur Heller (March 21, 1867 – May 19, 1944) was an American botanist.

Early life 
Heller was born in Danville, Pennsylvania.

In 1892, Heller received a Bachelor of Arts degree from Franklin & Marshall College. In 1897, he received a Master's degree in Botany from Franklin & Marshall College.

Career 
From 1896 to 1898, Heller was a professor of Botany at the University of Minnesota.

From 1898 to 1899, Heller worked on the Vanderbilt Expedition to Puerto Rico under the auspices of the New York Botanical Garden.

Starting in 1905, Heller was a professor of Botany at the California Academy of Sciences in San Francisco, California.

After moving to California, Heller and his wife, Emily Gertrude Heller, founded the botanical journal Muhlenbergia and Heller continued to edit that journal until 1915. He also obtained an impressive collection from Puerto Rico.

Personal life 
In 1896, Heller married Emily Gertrude Heller (née Halbach). She frequently collaborated with him both in the collection of specimens as well as illustrating his numerous publications.

Botanist author abbreviation

References

External links 
 Amos Arthur Heller papers, 1898-1940 at University of Washington Libraries

American taxonomists
1867 births
1944 deaths
Botanists active in California
Botanists active in the Caribbean
People from Chico, California
People from Los Gatos, California
Scientists from California
19th-century American botanists
20th-century American botanists